Donnelly House is a historic home located at New Lebanon in Columbia County, New York.  It was built about 1760 and is a modestly scaled saltbox style residence.  It is a two-story, three bay, center chimney, frame dwelling with narrow siding on a fieldstone foundation.  It measures 38 feet, 7 inches wide and 26 feet, 1/2 inch deep.  Also on the property are two small barns.

It was added to the National Register of Historic Places in 2000.

References

Houses on the National Register of Historic Places in New York (state)
Houses completed in 1760
Houses in Columbia County, New York
National Register of Historic Places in Columbia County, New York